Ghost Notes is the debut studio album by the Norwegian Christian extreme metal band Vardøger, released on November 24, 2015. The album marked a departure from the band's previous unblack metal and Viking metal style, instead performing a broader mix of extreme metal, progressive metal, and melodic death metal. The album was met with a highly positive critical reception. In 2018, the members of Vardøger opted to disband.

History 
Vardøger formed in 1994 as a side project of its respective members. Nearly an album's worth of songs were recorded between 1995 and 1997, but, apart from a compilation appearance in 2000, no material was officially released from the band until 2003, when it released the extended play Whitefrozen through Endtime Productions. Vardøger then disbanded in 2006.

Recording and packaging 
Vardøger reformed in 2008 to start recording a full-length studio album. The band underwent a major line-up change in 2010, early in the recording process. About three years after the release Ghost Notes, the group again disbanded due to a lack of continuing interest from the constituent musicians. The album was recorded at Studio 19 in Hamar, Norway and Space Valley Studio in Løten, Norway. It was mixed in East Lake Studio in Eina, Norway, by Jon Anders Narum, and mastered at Cuttingroom in Stockholm, Sweden. Production was handled by Robert Bordevik as well as the rest of the band. The album design, illustration, and logo artwork were by Page Black, and the cover art made by Craig H. Jackson.

Style 
Previously, Vardøger was known for playing a folk-influenced Christian black metal and Viking metal. On this release, the band dramatically reinvented themselves, performing a style described as progressive extreme metal and melodic death metal. Although sung vocals are used extensively, the music on Ghost Notes is faster, heavier, and more extreme than that on Whitefrozen. The songs tend to contrast the vocal technique between verse and chorus, with Peter Dalbakk performing death growls in the verses and Knut Anders Sørum and Johanne B. Bordevik singing the choruses. The songs also will alternate between from complex, Opeth-style riffs to simple rock chords. In "Ctf", the guitar is performed in a grooving staccato. "Ghost Notes" includes a hook in the style of Megadeth, and the second half of "Shine" features Gojira-like guitar and vocals reminiscent of Herbrand Larsen of Enslaved. "Shine" also alternates black metal stanzas with choruses that are almost like pop music. "Amongst the Damned" contains touch of piano in addition to the heavy guitar riffs, and features surprising musical twists similar to those in the music from Kekal. "Crystal Sky" and "My Demon" introduce musical changes more slowly, similar to the work of Extol. Jakob Plantinga of Rocklife.nl was of the opinion that the album is stylistically diverse enough to equally appeal to fans of black metal, progressive metal, and avant-garde metal.

Reception 

The album was received very warmly critics. Kristian Einang from Hamar Arbeiderblad gave the album a "die throw" of 5/6. They considered the album powerful, captivating, and impressive, and though while at times overwhelming, still a compelling debut. Jeffrey of Metalfan.nl rated the album 78/100. They considered it a very pleasant record, although in their opinion the production could be more dynamic and the songwriting streamlined, and some of the songs suffer from being too busy. However, the different song sections still complement each other well. Rocklife.nl rated Ghost Notes 9.5/10, calling the record a "masterpiece." They summarized that, without a doubt, Vardøger delivered a very strong album, and that the only thing to be desired is for another album to be released soon.

Track listing

Personnel

Band 

 Peter Dalbakk – Vocals
 Knut Anders Sørum  – Vocals
 Alexander Dalbakk –  Guitars, guitar technician
 Robert Bordevik –  Guitars, vocals, songwriting, production
 Johannes Baumann – Drums
 Henning Ramseth – Bass, keyboards, synth, programming arrangements
 Johanne B. Bordevik - Vocals

Additional personnel 

 Vardøger – Production
 Lars Olav Gjøra – Proofreading edits
 Jon Anders Narum – Mixing
 Page Black Design Bureau - Design, illustration, artwork
 Kine Jensen – Background photography 
 Craig H. Jackson – Cover art photography

References 

Vardøger (band) albums
2015 debut albums
Progressive death metal albums
Melodic death metal albums
Progressive metal albums by Norwegian artists
Death metal albums by Norwegian artists